Lundholm is a Swedish surname. Notable people with the surname include:

Bengt Lundholm (born 1955), Swedish retired professional ice hockey player
Carl Lundholm, American athletic director at the University of New Hampshire, for whom Lundholm Gym is named
Mathias Lundholm (1785–1860) Swedish violinist and conductor
Stig Lundholm (1917–2009), Swedish chess master

See also
Lundholm Gym,  multi-purpose arena in Durham, New Hampshire named for Carl Lundholm